Luca Dainelli was an Italian diplomat. 

Dainelli was the 8th Italian Ambassador to Pakistan. He is also remembered for making, in a March 1978 deposition, some unfounded accusations against Aldo Moro, in an attempt to exonerate Giovanni Leone. Beside being Italian ambassador to Pakistan, Dainelli was also Italian vice-consul in New York City.

See also 
 Ministry of Foreign Affairs (Italy)
 Foreign relations of Italy

References

Ambassadors of Italy to Pakistan
Italian diplomats
Living people
Year of birth missing (living people)